Portia is an unincorporated community in Vernon County, in the U.S. state of Missouri.

History
A post office called Portia was established in 1894, and remained in operation until 1903. The community may be named after Portia, the heroine of William Shakespeare's The Merchant of Venice.

References

Unincorporated communities in Vernon County, Missouri
Unincorporated communities in Missouri